Josef Johann Steinmann (8 March 1779, in Lanškroun – 9 July 1833, in Prague) was an Austrian pharmacist and chemist.

He worked as a pharmacist in Lanškroun and Prague, during which time, he conducted botanical investigations in the Riesengebirge and in Glatzer Land. Later on, he studied pharmacy in Berlin as a student of Sigismund Friedrich Hermbstädt, then in 1806–08 furthered his education at the University of Vienna, where his instructors included botanist Joseph Franz von Jacquin and naturalist Carl Franz Anton Ritter von Schreibers. From 1812 to 1817 he served as an assistant to chemist Karl August Neumann at the Prague Polytechnical Institute, where in 1817 he was appointed a professor of chemistry.

He provided chemical analyses of mineral springs at Marienbad, Bílina, Karlovy Vary, et al., and is credited with describing a new mineral species (cronstedtite, 1821). He also made significant contributions to the National Museum in Prague.

Published works 
 Chemische Untersuchung des Karpholiths, 1819 – Chemical analysis of carpholites.
 Chemische Untersuchung des Cronstedtit's eines neuen Fossils von Pribram in Böhmen, 1820 – Chemical analysis of cronstedtite from Příbram in Bohemia.
 Physikalisch-chemische Untersuchung der Ferdinandsquelle zu Marienbad, 1821 (with Julius Vincenz von Krombholz) – Physico-chemical study of the Ferdinand spring at Marienbad.  
 Das Saidschitzer Bitterwasser, 1827 (with Franz Ambrosius Reuss) – The bitter waters of Saidschitz.

References 

1779 births
1833 deaths
People from Lanškroun
University of Vienna alumni
Academic staff of Czech Technical University in Prague
Austrian chemists
Austrian pharmacists
German Bohemian people
Austrian people of German Bohemian descent